Azerbaijan is a country in the South Caucasus region. The country has an economy that has completed its post-Soviet transition into a major oil-based economy (with the completion of the Baku-Tbilisi-Ceyhan Pipeline), from one where the state played the major role. The government has largely completed privatization of agricultural lands and small and medium-sized enterprises. In August 2000, the government launched a second-stage privatization program, in which many large state enterprises will be privatized. Since 2001, the economic activity in the country is regulated by the Ministry of Economic Development of Azerbaijan Republic.

Notable firms 
This list includes notable companies with primary headquarters located in the country. The industry and sector follow the Industry Classification Benchmark taxonomy. Organizations which have ceased operations are included and noted as defunct.

See also 
 List of Azerbaijanis

References 

Azerbaijan